Diplomatic relations between Austria (then a part of Austria-Hungary) and Bulgaria were established in 1879. Austria has an embassy in Sofia and an honorary consulate in Burgas while Bulgaria has an embassy in Vienna and an honorary consulate in Salzburg.

Both countries are members of the European Union, Organization for Security and Co-operation in Europe and the Council of Europe.

History 

In April 2005, President of Bulgaria Georgi Parvanov paid a state visit to Austria.

See also
 Foreign relations of Austria
 Foreign relations of Bulgaria
 Bulgarians in Austria

References

External links
 Austrian Foreign Ministry: list of bilateral treaties with Bulgaria (in German only)

 
Bulgaria
Austria